A Rogue's Wife is a 1915 British silent crime film directed by Percy Nash and starring Gregory Scott, Daisy Cordell and Joan Ritz.

Cast
 Gregory Scott    
 Daisy Cordell
 Joan Ritz   
 Frank Tennant

References

Bibliography
 Palmer, Scott. British Film Actors' Credits, 1895-1987. McFarland, 1988.

External links

1915 films
1915 crime films
British crime films
British silent feature films
Films directed by Percy Nash
British black-and-white films
1910s English-language films
1910s British films